Walter Samuel McAfee (September 2, 1914 – February 18, 1995) was an American scientist and astronomer, notable for participating in the world's first lunar radar echo experiments with Project Diana.

Personal life 
McAfee was born in Ore City, Texas to African-American parents Luther F. McAfee and Susie A. Johnson; he was the second of their nine children. At three months old, the family moved to Marshall, Texas, where McAfee would grow up and attend undergraduate school. He graduated high school in Marshall in 1930, and later noted that his high school physics and chemistry teacher, Freeman Prince Hodge, was a great influence of his. Following the completion of his master's degree, McAfee took a job in 1939 teaching science and mathematics in Columbus, Ohio. In 1941, he married Viola Winston, who taught French at the same junior high school in Columbus, Ohio where McAfee taught. McAfee and Winston had two daughters. McAfee died at his home in South Belmar, New Jersey, on February 18, 1995.

Education 
McAfee attended Wiley College, where his mother studied, graduating with a B.S. in mathematics in 1934. Following his undergraduate work, McAfee attended Ohio State University and earned his M.S. in physics in 1937. After his work on Project Diana with the United States Army Signal Corps Engineering Laboratories,  McAfee returned to school, receiving the Rosenwald Fellowship to continue his doctoral studies at Cornell University. In 1949, McAfee was awarded his PhD in Physics for his work on nuclear collisions under Hans Bethe.

Biography
McAfee left his teaching position in Ohio when he was hired by the Army Signal Corps to work at the Electronics Research Command at Fort Monmouth, New Jersey, in May 1942. It was here that he participated in Project Diana, completing the first calculations showing that radar signals could be successfully bounced from a ground-based antenna to the Moon and back; this prediction was verified experimentally in 1946.

During his time at Fort Monmouth, he also lectured in physics and electronics at Monmouth College (now Monmouth University) from 1958 to 1975, and served as a trustee at Brookdale Community College.

Honors and awards 

In 1961, McAfee received the first U.S. Army Research and Development Achievement Award. He was eventually promoted to GS-16, the highest civilian rank achieved to date by any African-American person. After his death a research building at Aberdeen Proving Ground was named in his honor (2011) and he was inducted into the Army Material Command's Hall of Fame (2015).

Selected publications 

 Walter S. McAfee. Determination of energy spectra of backscattered electrons by use of Everhart's theory. Journal of Applied Physics 47, 1179 (1976); https://doi.org/10.1063/1.322700.
 Gerald J. Iafrate, Walter S. McAfee, and A. Ballato. Electron backscattering from solids and double layers. Journal of Vacuum Science and Technology 13, 843 (1976); https://doi.org/10.1116/1.569000.

References

External links
McAfee's oral history for No Short Climb

1914 births
1995 deaths
African Americans in World War II
NASA people
American scientists
People from Monmouth County, New Jersey
Ohio State University alumni
Wiley College alumni
20th-century African-American scientists
Cornell University alumni